Ran Hirschl  (רן הירשל; born September 23, 1963) is a political scientist and comparative legal scholar. He is Professor of Government and Earl E. Sheffield Regents Chair in Law at The University of Texas at Austin.  Previously, he was a professor of political science and law and former Canada Research Chair at the University of Toronto. He is the author of several major books and over one hundred and thirty articles on constitutional law and its intersection with comparative politics and society. In 2014, he was elected a Fellow of the Royal Society of Canada. In 2021, he was awarded the Stein Rokkan Prize for Comparative Social Science Research for his book City, State: Constitutionalism and the Megacity.

Early life and education
Hirschl was born on September 23, 1963. He studied law and political science at Tel Aviv University in Israel and, upon receiving a Fulbright scholarship, he received his doctorate from Yale University in 1999.

Career
Upon receiving his PhD, Hirschl joined the department of political science at the University of Toronto (U of T) as an assistant professor in 1999, and promoted to associate professor in 2003 and to full professor in 2006. In this role, he studied Canadian and comparative public law, constitutional and judicial politics earning him a cross-faculty appointment to U of T's Faculty of Law. Prior to his appointment, Hirschl published his first book titled Towards Juristocracy in 2004 through the Harvard University Press, winner of the American Political Science Association (APSA) Law & Courts Section 2021 Lasting Contribution Award. His book argued that constitutional reform understood as the transfer of power from representative institutions to judiciaries is often the product of a strategic move he termed "hegemonic preservation" led by challenged political elites who aspire to entrench their worldviews and policy preferences against the vicissitudes of democratic politics. The following year, Hirschl and his wife Ayelet Shachar were awarded Canada Research Chairs (CRC) positions, with him being appointed a Tier 1 CRC in Constitutionalism, Democracy, and Development.

As a Canada Research Chair, Hirschl published his second book on the topic of Constitutional theocracy which received the 2011 Mahoney Prize in Legal Theory from the Julius Stone Institute of Jurisprudence in the Faculty of Law at the University of Sydney. Following this, he was awarded the Canada Council for the Arts' Killam Research Fellowship, which he planned to use towards completing his third book on the foundations and evolution of comparative constitutional studies. The book, titled Comparative Matters: The Renaissance of Comparative Constitutional Studies, was eventually published in 2014 and received the American Political Science Association C. Herman Pritchett Award for the Best Book on Law & Courts for 2015. In the same year as the book's publication, Hirschl was elected Fellow of the Royal Society of Canada. In 2017, he was awarded an Alexander von Humboldt International Research Award by the Humboldt Fondation. Hirschl was awarded the 2021 Stein Rokkan Prize for Comparative Social Science Research for his book City, State: Constitutionalism and the Megacity.

Selected publications
The following is a list of selected publications:
Towards Juristocracy (2004 & 2007) 
 Constitutional Theocracy  (2010)
Comparative Matters: The Renaissance of Comparative Constitutional Law (2014 & 2016)
City, State: Constitutionalism and the Megacity (2020)

References 

Living people
1963 births
Israeli political scientists
Fellows of the Royal Society of Canada
Canada Research Chairs
Canadian legal scholars
Yale Law School alumni
Tel Aviv University alumni
Academic staff of the University of Toronto Faculty of Law
Winners of the Stein Rokkan Prize for Comparative Social Science Research